The 2014 Turkmenistan Cup was the 2014 edition of the Turkmenistan Cup. The cup winner qualified for the 2015 AFC Cup.

Preliminary round
Preliminary Round involves 2 teams. Games played on 1 and 5 August 2014.

|}

Quarter-finals

|}

Semi-finals

Semi-finals involves 2 teams. Games played on 7 and 10 October 2014.

|}

Final

References

Turkmenistan Cup
Turkmenistan
Turkmenistan Cup